The Makunda River is a branch of the Surma in Chhatak and Bishwanath Upazilas, Sunamganj District, Bangladesh. Many important places such as Rajagonj, Boiragi Bazar, Koro Para village, Singer Kach Bazaar, Lakeshbor, Buria and Jahidpur are established on the bank of the Makunda.

River flow
This river is ended at the western end of Jahidpur. So origin of river Makunda is The Surma and the ending is in Jahidpur. Brief introduction of the Makunda is "From Surma to Jahidpur.

References

 

Rivers of Bangladesh
Bishwanath Upazila
Rivers of Sylhet Division